Aeonium canariense is a species of flowering plant in the family Crassulaceae. It is endemic to the island of Tenerife in the Canary Islands, where it grows on dry slopes and cliffs in the north of the island from sea level to about 1300m. It forms large rosettes of leaves close to the ground but the spikes of yellow flowers stand up to 70 cm tall.

References

Plants described in 1841
canariense